Khonik Vitaly Alexandrovich (Russian: Хоник Виталий Александрович; born 17 December 1955) is a Russian physicist, doctor of physics and mathematics, professor, head of a laboratory researching the physics of non-crystalline materials, and head of the Department of General Physics at Voronezh State Pedagogical University (VSPU). He was born in Kemerovo, USSR.

His laboratory collaborates with the Institute of Solid State Physics of the Russian Academy of Sciences, the Institute of Physics of the Slovak Academy of Sciences, the Institut für Materialphysik in Germany and the School of Mechanics and Civil Architecture of Northwestern Polytechical University in China.

Education, academic degrees and titles 

 1994 - Professor
 1992 - Doctor of Science (physics & mathematics), focusing on solid state physics
 1991 - Senior researcher in solid state physics
 1983 - Candidate for a doctoral degree in solid state physics
 1978 - Graduated from Voronezh Polytechnic Institute (VPI), majoring in solid state physics

Employment history 

 2010 to present - Head of the Department of General Physics at VSPU
 1992 to 2010 - Professor at VSPU
 1992 - Associate professor at VSPU
 1991-1992 - Associate professor at VPI
 1985-1991 - Senior researcher at VPI
 1984-1985 - Junior researcher at VPI
 1981-1983 - Doctoral student at VPI
 1978-1981 - Engineer and physicist at VPI

Academic awards 
 Awarded the title "Soros Professor" in 1997, 1998 and 1999. 
 Honored Worker in Higher Professional Education (2011).

International experience 

 July 2019 - Visiting professor at Northwestern Polytechical University, Xi'an, China
 July 2018 - Visiting professor at Northwestern Polytechical University, Xi'an, China
 October 2016 - Visiting professor at the Institute of Physics, Chinese Academy of Sciences, Beijing, China
 August 2012 - Visiting professor at the Department of Physics, University of Illinois at Urbana-Champaign, USA
 May 2009 - Guest professor at the School of Materials Science, Harbin Institute of Technology, China
 April 2007 – Guest professor at Roskilde University, Denmark
 January 2007 to February 2007 – Visiting scholar at the Physics Department, University of Illinois at Urbana-Champaign, USA
 January 2006 to March 2006  – Scholar of the Japanese Society for the Promotion of Science (JSPS) at the Graduate School of Natural Science and Technology of Kanazawa University, Japan
 January 2005 to February 2005 – Visiting scholar at the Physics Department, University of Illinois at Urbana-Champaign, USA
 April 2003 to August 2003 – Visiting scholar at the Physics Department, University of Illinois at Urbana-Champaign, USA
 October 2002 to December 2002 – Scholar of the German Service for Academic Exchanges (DAAD), Technical University Carolo-Wilhelmina, Braunschweig, Germany
 May 1999 to April 2000 – Associate professor of the Mechanical System Engineering Department, Kanazawa University, Kanazawa, Japan
 Visiting professor at the Institute of Experimental Physics, Slovak Academy of Sciences, Kosice, Slovakia (two to four week visits in 1996, 1998 and 2001)

International conferences and workshops 

 Internal Friction and Ultrasonic Attenuation (ICIFUAS, Italy 1993, France 1996, Spain 2002) 
 Mechanical Spectroscopy (Poland 2000) 
 Structure of Non-Crystalline Solids (Czech Republic 1996) 
 18th International Congress on Glass (USA 1998) 
 Physics of Amorphous Solids: Mechanical Properties and Plasticity (France, Les Houches, March 2010 )
 ACAM Workshop on Multiscale Modelling of Amorphous Materials: from Structure to Mechnical Properties (Dublin, Ireland, July 2011)
 8th International Discussion Meeting on Relaxations in Complex Systems (Wisla, Poland, July 2017).

Major scientific projects 
 Ministry of Education and Science of the Russian Federation, No 3.114.2014/К, "Nature of relaxation phenomena in non-crystalline metallic materials - new theoretical concepts and experiments", 2014–2016.
 Ministry of Education and Science of the Russian Federation, No 3.1310.2017/4.6, "Shear elasticity relaxation as a fundamental basis for the description and prediction of the physical properties of amorphous alloys", 2017–2019.
 Russian Science Foundation, No 20-62-46003, "Amorphous alloys: a new approach to the understanding of the defect structure and its influence on physical properties", 2020 – present.

References

External links

Russian physicists
Russian mathematicians
1955 births
Living people